Martina Hingis and Helena Suková were the defending champions but they competed with different partners that year, Hingis with Arantxa Sánchez Vicario and Suková with Larisa Savchenko.

Savchenko and Suková lost in the final 4–6, 6–4, 6–1 against Hingis and Sánchez Vicario.

Seeds
Champion seeds are indicated in bold text while text in italics indicates the round in which those seeds were eliminated.

Draw

Qualifying

Seeds
Both seeds received a bye into the second round.

Qualifiers
  Annie Miller /  Brie Rippner

Qualifying draw

External links
 Official results archive (ITF)
 Official results archive (WTA)

Zurich Open
1997 WTA Tour